Ding Wei (born 16 May 1979 in Nanhua County, Chuxiong, Yunnan) is a Chinese professional Go player.

Biography 
In 1992, Ding became a professional. He advanced a rank every year until 2001, when he reached 8 dan. After six years, he reached his current rank of 9 dan.

In 1997, Ding won his first title, the National Go Individual. His second and latest title came in 2000, when he won the CCTV Cup.

Past titles and runners-up

References

External links 
 Go Game World player profile

Living people
1979 births
Chinese Go players
Sportspeople from Yunnan
People from Chuxiong